Ajan Yelli (also Romanized as Ājan Yelli) is a village in Aq Su Rural District, in the Central District of Kalaleh County, Golestan Province, Iran. At the 2006 census, its population was 738, in 163 families.

References 

Populated places in Kalaleh County